Degenaar is a Dutch surname. Notable people with the surname include:

 Johan Degenaar (1926–2015), South African philosopher
 Rudy Degenaar (1963–1989), Suriname footballer

Afrikaans-language surnames
Surnames of Dutch origin